Ozaki (written:  or ) is a Japanese surname. Notable people with the surname include:

, Japanese singer-songwriter
, Japanese footballer
, Japanese actor
, Japanese poet
, Japanese singer-songwriter
, Japanese journalist
, Japanese footballer
, Japanese taekwondo practitioner and kickboxer
, Japanese poet
, Japanese judge
, Japanese writer
, Japanese long-distance runner
, Japanese politician
, Japanese golfer
, Japanese baseball player
, Japanese professional wrestler
, Japanese sport shooter
Milton K. Ozaki (1913–1989), American writer
, Japanese manga artist
, Japanese Paralympic athlete
, Japanese politician and businessman
, Japanese gravure idol
, Japanese actress
, Japanese golfer
, Japanese poet
, Japanese tennis player
, Japanese photographer
, Japanese badminton player
, Japanese model
, Japanese mountain climber
, Japanese golfer
, Japanese long-distance runner
, Japanese footballer
, Japanese voice actress and actress
, Japanese scientist
, Japanese politician
, Japanese footballer
, Japanese musician
, Japanese musician

Japanese-language surnames